Benedetto Justiniani (1550 – 19 December 1622) was a Jesuit theologian and Biblical scholar from Genoa, in what is today Italy.

Justiniani entered the Jesuit noviciate at Rome in 1579 and later taught rhetoric in the Roman College, and then theology at Toulouse, Messina, and Rome. For more than twenty years, he served as head of the Roman College and regens of the Sacra Poenitentiaria (Apostolic Penitentiary). He also filled the post of Chief Preacher to the Pope. Pope Clement VIII appointed him theologian to Cardinal Thomas Cajetan, during his legation in Poland. Justiniani died at Rome in 1622.

Works
Justiniani's writings include:
In omnes B. Pauli Epistolas explanationes, 2 vols.
In omnes Catholicas Epistolas explanationes
Apologia pro libertate ecclesiastica ad Gallo-Francos

References

1550 births
1622 deaths
16th-century Genoese people
17th-century Genoese people
16th-century Italian Jesuits
17th-century Italian Jesuits
16th-century Italian Roman Catholic theologians
17th-century Italian Roman Catholic theologians
16th-century Christian biblical scholars
17th-century Christian biblical scholars
Italian biblical scholars